1926 in sports describes the year's events in world sport.

American football
 NFL championship – Frankford Yellow Jackets (14–1–2)
 Rose Bowl (1925 season):
 The Alabama Crimson Tide won 20–19 over the Washington Huskies to share the college football national championship

Association football
England
 The Football League – Huddersfield Town 57 points, Arsenal 52, Sunderland 48, Bury 47, Sheffield United 46, Aston Villa 44
 FA Cup final – Bolton Wanderers 1–0 Manchester City at Empire Stadium, Wembley, London
 Huddersfield Town is the first team to win the League championship title three times in succession.
Germany
 National Championship – SpVgg Fürth 4–1 Hertha BSC at Frankfurt
Greece
 Formation of the Hellenic Football Federation (HFF)

Athletics
Sweden
 the Second Women's World Games, Gothenburg

Australian rules football
VFL Premiership
 Melbourne wins the 30th VFL Premiership: Melbourne 17.17 (119) d Collingwood 9.8 (62) at Melbourne Cricket Ground (MCG)
Brownlow Medal
 The annual Brownlow Medal is awarded to Ivor Warne-Smith (Melbourne)

Bandy
Sweden
 Championship final – Västerås SK 1-0 IK Sirius

Baseball
World Series
 2–10 October — St. Louis Cardinals (NL) defeats New York Yankees (AL) to win the 1926 World Series by 4 games to 3
Negro leagues
 Rube Foster, founder of the Negro National League (NNL) and owner and manager of the Chicago American Giants, suffers a nervous breakdown and has to be confined to an asylum.  His protégé Dave Malarcher takes over as manager and leads the team to the NNL pennant.
 The Chicago American Giants (NNL) defeat the Bacharach Giants of Atlantic City, New Jersey (ECL), 5 games to 3, in the 1926 Colored World Series.
 Mule Suttles of the St. Louis Stars hits a Negro leagues record 27 home runs.  His .498 batting average and 21 triples are also records.

Basketball
ABL Championship

Cleveland Rosenblums win three games to none over the Brooklyn Arcadians

Boxing
Events
 23 September — Gene Tunney defeats Jack Dempsey over 10 rounds in Philadelphia to win the World Heavyweight Championship
 Tiger Flowers twice defeats Harry Greb for the World Middleweight Championship but then loses it to former World Welterweight Champion Mickey Walker who holds it until 1931
Lineal world champions
 World Heavyweight Championship – Jack Dempsey → Gene Tunney
 World Light Heavyweight Championship – Paul Berlenbach → Jack Delaney
 World Middleweight Championship – Harry Greb → Tiger Flowers → Mickey Walker
 World Welterweight Championship – Mickey Walker → Pete Latzo
 World Lightweight Championship – Rocky Kansas → Sammy Mandell
 World Featherweight Championship – Louis "Kid" Kaplan → vacant
 World Bantamweight Championship – Charley Phil Rosenberg
 World Flyweight Championship – vacant

Canadian football
Grey Cup
 14th Grey Cup – Ottawa Senators 10–7 Toronto Varsity Blues

Cricket
Events
 31 May — India, New Zealand and West Indies are elected as Full Members of the Imperial Cricket Conference, increasing the number of nations playing Test cricket from three to six.
 England regains The Ashes from Australia by winning the five-match Test series 1–0.  After the first four Tests are drawn, England wins the final match at The Oval by 289 runs.
England
 County Championship – Lancashire
 Minor Counties Championship – Durham
 Most runs – Jack Hobbs 2949 @ 77.60 (HS 316*)
 Most wickets – Charlie Parker 213 @ 18.40 (BB 8–73)
 Wisden Cricketers of the Year – George Geary, Harold Larwood, Jack Mercer, Bert Oldfield, Bill Woodfull
Australia
 Sheffield Shield – New South Wales
 Most runs – Arthur Richardson 904 @ 50.22 (HS 227)
 Most wickets – Clarrie Grimmett 59 @ 30.40 (BB 6–76)
 Victoria score 1,107 against New South Wales at the Melbourne Cricket Ground in December 1926 - still the largest innings total in first-class cricket.
India
 Bombay Quadrangular – Hindus
New Zealand
 Plunket Shield – Wellington
South Africa
 Currie Cup –  not contested
West Indies
 Inter-Colonial Tournament – Trinidad and Tobago

Cycling
Tour de France
 Lucien Buysse (Belgium) wins the 20th Tour de France

Figure skating
World Figure Skating Championships
 World Women's Champion – Herma Szabo (Austria)
 World Men's Champion – Willi Böckel (Austria)
 World Pairs Champions – Andreé Joly-Brunet and Pierre Brunet (France)

Golf
Events
 Bobby Jones becomes the first golfer to win the British and US Open titles in the same year.
Major tournaments
 British Open – Bobby Jones
 US Open – Bobby Jones
 USPGA Championship – Walter Hagen
Other tournaments
 British Amateur – Jess Sweetser
 US Amateur – George Von Elm

Horse racing
England
 Cheltenham Gold Cup – Koko
 Grand National – Jack Horner
 19 April – Willie Watkinson, the Grand National-winning jockey, dies three weeks after his victory in a fall at Bogside, Scotland
 1,000 Guineas Stakes – Pillion
 2,000 Guineas Stakes – Colorado
 The Derby – Coronach
 The Oaks – Short Story
 St. Leger Stakes – Coronach
Australia
 Melbourne Cup – Spearfelt
Canada
 King's Plate – Haplite
France
 Prix de l'Arc de Triomphe – Biribi
Ireland
 Irish Grand National – Amberwave
 Irish Derby Stakes – Embargo
USA
 Kentucky Derby – Bubbling Over
 Preakness Stakes – Display
 Belmont Stakes – Crusader

Ice hockey
Stanley Cup
 30 March to 6 April — Montreal Maroons defeats Victoria Cougars in the 1926 Stanley Cup Finals by 3 games to 1
Events
 Allan Cup – University of Toronto defeats Port Arthur Bearcats
 Memorial Cup – Calgary Canadians defeats Queen's University
 The professional Western Hockey League folds; most players are sold for $300,000 to the National Hockey League (NHL).
 December — new expansion teams debut in the NHL: Chicago Black Hawks, Detroit Cougars and New York Rangers

Lacrosse
Events
 Rosabelle Sinclair establishes the United States' first women's lacrosse team at Bryn Mawr School

Motorsport

Nordic skiing
FIS Nordic World Ski Championships
 2nd FIS Nordic World Ski Championships 1926 are held at Lahti, Finland

Rowing
The Boat Race
 27 March — Cambridge wins the 78th Oxford and Cambridge Boat Race

Rugby league
England
 Championship – Wigan
 Challenge Cup final – Swinton 9–3 Oldham at Athletic Grounds, Rochdale
 Lancashire League Championship – Wigan
 Yorkshire League Championship – Hull Kingston Rovers
 Lancashire County Cup – Swinton 15–11 Wigan
 Yorkshire County Cup – Dewsbury 2–0 Huddersfield
Australia
 NSW Premiership – South Sydney 11–5 University (grand final)

Rugby union
Five Nations Championship
 39th Five Nations Championship series is shared by Ireland and Scotland

Speed skating
Speed Skating World Championships
 Men's Allround Champion @ Trondheim, Norway – Ivar Ballangrud (Norway)
 Overall Ladies World Champion @ Saint John, New Brunswick – Lela Brooks (Canada)
 World Outdoor Champion – Charles Gorman (Canada)
 International Outdoor Champion in pack style – John Farrell (United States)

Tennis
Australia
 Australian Men's Singles Championship – John Hawkes (Australia) defeats James Willard (Australia) 6–1 6–3 6–1
 Australian Women's Singles Championship – Daphne Akhurst Cozens (Australia) defeats Esna Boyd Robertson (Australia) 6–1 6–3
England
 Wimbledon Men's Singles Championship – Jean Borotra (France) defeats Howard Kinsey (USA) 8–6 6–1 6–3
 Wimbledon Women's Singles Championship – Kitty McKane Godfree (Great Britain) defeats Lilí de Álvarez (Spain) 6–2 4–6 6–3
France
 French Men's Singles Championship – Henri Cochet (France) defeats René Lacoste (France) 6–2 6–4 6–3
 French Women's Singles Championship – Suzanne Lenglen (France) defeats Mary Browne (USA) 6–1 6–0
USA
 American Men's Singles Championship – René Lacoste (France) defeats Jean Borotra (France) 6–4 6–0 6–4
 American Women's Singles Championship – Molla Bjurstedt Mallory (Norway) defeats Elizabeth Ryan (USA) 4–6 6–4 9–7
Davis Cup
 1926 International Lawn Tennis Challenge –  4–1  at Germantown Cricket Club (grass) Philadelphia, United States

References

 
Sports by year